Conandron is a genus that consists of 3 species of small ornamental alpine perennials, native to Japan and Taiwan. The botanical names comes from the Greek, meaning "cone-shaped anther". These plants are almost stemless herb with radical glabrous rugose, thick winkled leaves in flat tuffs  leaves some 6in long. Erect flowering stems emerge from the ground bearing numerous pretty, lilac and white, star-shaped blossoms with bright purple at center in summer.

Species
Conandron minor
Conandron ramondiodes
Conandron rhynchotechioides

References
Botanica_Sistematica

Didymocarpoideae
Gesneriaceae genera